Washington Methodist Church is a historic church at Highway 61 North and the north end of Morgantown Road in Washington, Mississippi.

It was organized in 1799 by Rev Tobias Gibson. The present church building was built in 1828 and added to the National Register in 1986.

References

Methodist churches in Mississippi
Churches on the National Register of Historic Places in Mississippi
Federal architecture in Mississippi
Churches completed in 1828
19th-century Methodist church buildings in the United States
Churches in Adams County, Mississippi
National Register of Historic Places in Adams County, Mississippi